Hear My Cry, (Polish: Usłyszcie mój krzyk, literally "Hear My Scream") is a 1991 Polish documentary film directed by Maciej Drygas.

Storyline
The story of an ordinary accountant from south-east Poland, Ryszard Siwiec, who set himself on fire during the large harvest festival at the Warsaw stadium in 1968. He did it to protest against the military invasion in Czechoslovakia.

Production 
The film's director, Maciej Drygas, first learned of Ryszard Siwiec in the summer of 1989 when he read an interview in Gazeta Wyborcza with Adam Macedoński who worked to further Polish-Czech relations. Drygas was currently writing a screenplay which included the story of the self-immolation of Romas Kalanta and became interested in the phenomenon and the lack of information on Siwiec's death. He started by looking through newspapers from 1968, but didn't find any information. The first clue he found was in the Central Agency of Photography where he found that two photographs of the sector in which Siwiec set himself on fire had been destroyed. He continued his search and eventually met Siwiec's wife, Maria, and her daughter Elżbieta in Przemyśl, thanks to them gaining access to the recording that Siwiec had made two days before his departure for Warsaw.

Cast
Ryszard Siwiec - Himself (archive footage)
Maria Siwiec - Herself
Innocenta Siwiec - Herself
Elzbieta Siwiec - Herself
Wit Siwiec - Himself
Adam Siwiec - Himself
Mariusz Siwiec - Himself
Maria Wojciechowska - Herself
Tadeusz Kaminski - Himself
Jan Janiszewski - Himself
Zbigniew Wojciechowski - Himself
Grazyna Niezgoda - Herself
Zbigniew Skoczek - Himself
Stanislawa Konska - Herself
Michal Szymlowski - Himself
Jan Dyjak - Himself
Leszek Lozynski - Himself
Hubert Uszynski - Himself
Halina Lagowska - Herself
Józef Tischner - Himself

Awards and accolades

References

External links
 
 Filmweb
 FilmPolski

Biographical documentary films
Polish black-and-white films
1991 documentary films
1991 films
1990s short documentary films
Polish short documentary films
European Film Awards winners (films)
Warsaw Pact invasion of Czechoslovakia